Ana María Liliana Sánchez Vargas de Ríos (born 28 January 1959) is a Peruvian diplomat. She was the country's Minister of Foreign Affairs from 2 April 2015 to 28 July 2016.

Biography
Ana María Sánchez de Ríos is a lawyer graduated from the Pontifical Catholic University of Peru.

In 1980 she entered the Diplomatic Service of Peru. She was promoted to the position of ambassador on 1 January 2013.

She has performed functions within the Ministry of Foreign Affairs – in the Undersecretariat of Foreign Policy; in the Directorate of America; in the Privileges and Immunities Directorate; in the General Directorate of Administration; in the Directorate of Political Cooperation and Integration; in the Coordination Office of the Vice Minister and Secretary General; was Director of Border Development and Integration; was Director of Integration-Economic Affairs; and was Chief of the Ministerial Office for three Foreign Ministers before her appointment to the post.

Postings abroad
She has served in Peru's embassy in Hungary, its consulate in São Paulo, its consulate in Mexico City, and in the Permanent Representation of Peru in the Organization of American States (OAS).  Since May 2019 she has been Peruvian ambassador to Ireland.

Minister of Foreign Affairs

On 2 April 2015, she was sworn in as Minister of Foreign Affairs, joining the Council of Ministers chaired by Pedro Cateriano, the seventh of the government of President Ollanta Humala. The ceremony was held in the Golden Hall of the Government Palace. With her appointment she became the first woman in the diplomatic corps of Peru to be appointed Foreign Minister (her predecessor, Eda Rivas, was not a career diplomat). A day earlier, she had been named ambassador of Peru to France, a designation that was superseded as she assumed her new responsibility.

Decorations
 2008: Military Order of Ayacucho, in the rank of Commander
 2015: Dame Grand Cross of the Order of Isabella the Catholic (Spain)
 2015: Grand Cross of the Order of the Sun of Peru
 2015: Grand Cross of the Order of Merit for Distinguished Services
 2015: Grand Cross of the José Gregorio Paz Soldán Order of Merit of the Diplomatic Service of Peru

See also
 Humala administration

References

External links

 CV at the Ministry of Foreign Affairs 

1959 births
20th-century Peruvian lawyers
Ambassadors of Peru to Ireland
Dames Grand Cross of the Order of Isabella the Catholic
Female foreign ministers
Foreign ministers of Peru
Living people
People from Lima
Pontifical Catholic University of Peru alumni
Peruvian women ambassadors
Women government ministers of Peru
20th-century women lawyers
Permanent Representatives of Peru to the Organization of American States